Villeret may refer to:

 Villeret, Aisne, France
 Villeret, Aube, France
 Villeret, Switzerland
 Jacques Villeret, French actor